The Lockheed RC-130 Hercules  are variants of the C-130 Hercules designed for photographic or electronic reconnaissance missions.

Operational history

On 2 September 1958, C-130A-II 56-0528 was shot down after it intruded into Soviet airspace during a reconnaissance mission along the Turkish-Armenian border.

Variants
C-130A-II
Electronics reconnaissance variant for use by 7407th Combat Support Wing, ten conversions from C-130A.
RC-130A
Photo reconnaissance variant, one converted from a TC-130A and 15 built new.
C-130B-II
Electronic reconnaissance variant, 15 converted from C-130B later designated RC-130B.
RC-130B
Re-designated from C-130B-II, all later converted back to C-130Bs.
RC-130S
Two JC-130A aircraft were modified with the Battlefield Illumination Airborne System (BIAS) for night search-and rescue missions with the 446th Tactical Airlift Wing.

Operators

 United States Air Force

See also

References

Bibliography
 Francillon, René. Lockheed Aircraft since 1913. London: Putnam, 1982. .

C-130, R
1950s United States military reconnaissance aircraft
Four-engined tractor aircraft
High-wing aircraft
Four-engined turboprop aircraft
RC-130